Roland Schlimme is a Canadian film editor. He is most noted for his work on the 2010 documentary film Acquainted with the Night, for which he was a Gemini Award nominee for Best Picture Editing in a Documentary Program or Series at the 26th Gemini Awards in 2011, and the 2017 documentary film Long Time Running, for which he received a Canadian Screen Award nomination for Best Editing in a Documentary at the 6th Canadian Screen Awards in 2018.

He is also a two-time nominee for the Canadian Cinema Editors awards, receiving nods in 2011 for Acquainted with the Night and in 2014 for The Ghosts in Our Machine, and was a winner of the Directors Guild of Canada's DGC Craft Award for Picture Editing in a Documentary in 2020 for Meat the Future.

He works predominantly but not exclusively on documentary films.

Credits

References

External links

Canadian film editors
Living people
Year of birth missing (living people)